There are over 9,000 Grade I listed buildings in England. This page is a list of these buildings in the unitary authority of Cheshire West and Chester.

List of buildings

|}

Notes

See also

Grade I listed buildings in Cheshire
 Grade I listed buildings in Cheshire West and Chester
 Grade I listed buildings in Cheshire East
 Grade I listed buildings in Warrington
 Grade I listed buildings in Halton (borough)
Grade II* listed buildings in Cheshire West and Chester

References
Citations

Sources

External links

 
Chesh